Methionine-S-oxide reductase (methyl sulfoxide reductase I and II, acetylmethionine sulfoxide reductase, methionine sulfoxide reductase, L-methionine:oxidized-thioredoxin S-oxidoreductase) is an enzyme with systematic name L-methionine:thioredoxin-disulfide S-oxidoreductase. This enzyme catalyses the following chemical reaction

 L-methionine + thioredoxin disulfide + H2O  L-methionine S-oxide + thioredoxin

In the reverse reaction, dithiothreitol can replace reduced thioredoxin.

References

External links 
 

EC 1.8.4